Forest-East railway station is a railway station in the municipality of Forest in Brussels, Belgium. The station, operated by the National Railway Company of Belgium (NMBS/SNCB), is located on the Belgian railway line 124, between the stations of Brussels-South and Uccle-Stalle.

Train services
The station is served by the following service(s):

Brussels RER services (S1) Antwerp - Mechelen - Brussels - Waterloo - Nivelles (weekdays)
Brussels RER services (S1) Brussels - Waterloo - Nivelles (weekends)

References

External links
 

Forest, Belgium
Railway stations in Brussels
Railway stations opened in 1873